2010 FIBA Asia Stanković Cup was the 3rd FIBA Asia Stankovic Cup. The basketball tournament of FIBA Asia was held in Beirut, Lebanon from 7 August to 15 August 2010, in Ghazir Club Court involving 10 national teams from Asia.

The 3rd FIBA Asia Stankovic Cup was the first FIBA Asia event to be hosted in Lebanon for national teams. The 3rd FIBA Asia Stankovic Cup was the qualifying event for the 26th FIBA Asia Championship in 2011, to be hosted in Wuhan, Hubei, China, which in turn will be the qualifying event for 2012 London Olympics. The winner of the 3rd FIBA Asia Stankovic Cup automatically qualified for the FIBA Asia Championship in 2011. The top five teams at the 3rd FIBA Asia Stankovic Cup earned additional berths for their respective FIBA Asia sub zones.

Qualification
According to the FIBA Asia rules, each zone had one place, and the hosts (Lebanon) and Asian champion (Iran) were automatically qualified. The other three places are allocated to the zones according to performance in the 2009 FIBA Asia Championship.

* , was given a wild card entry into the championship.

Preliminary round

Group A

Group B

Classification 9th–10th

Final round

Quarterfinals

Semifinals 5th–8th

Semifinals

7th place

5th place

3rd place

Final

Final standing

Awards

External links
 Tournament official website

2010–11 in Asian basketball
2010–11 in Lebanese basketball
International basketball competitions hosted by Lebanon
2010
Sport in Beirut